Never a Dull Moment is the first solo album by then former Mötley Crüe drummer Tommy Lee, released on May 21, 2002 by MCA.

Background
Tommy Lee began writing music in September 2000, following Methods of Mayhem's stint on Ozzfest. Lee described the process in a 2002 interview:
"I locked myself in my home and I just started writing. I didn't know what I wanted to do; it was more like [I thought] 'let's just write and see where this goes and make this like a natural progression.' What you hear is where it went. The more we started listening to it [in the studio] the more my producer started going, 'Dude, you know, you can just call this what it is.' I was like, 'What are you talking about?' And he goes, 'Why don't you just call this Tommy Lee?' After thinking about it for a while, I realized he was right. That's when I made that decision, to just go under my own name rather than a 'band' name."

Never a Dull Moment features the hit single "Hold Me Down". Its music video debuted in late April and found significant airplay on MTV2. Directed by Dean Karr, it revolves around Lee riding a strange flying machine which crashes. Cirque du Soleil-like performers are also featured in the video. "Hold Me Down" was performed on The Tonight Show with Jay Leno on May 22, 2002. The track, as well as the singles "Sunday" and "Ashamed" aired on Muzak's Power Rock station as well. "Ashamed" also featured a Music video.

Aside from basic alternative metal, Never a Dull Moment encompasses a variety of styles. Ballads are offered through "Ashamed" and "Blue", which features guest vocals by Brandon Boyd, and "Sunday" boasts Neue Deutsche Härte aesthetics. A cover of David Bowie's "Fame" is also featured on the album. In promotion of the album, Tommy Lee embarked on a tour beginning on May 24, 2002 and ending on July 20. This features bands such as Abandoned Pools and Headstrong. He also appeared on the Rock Fest 2003 tour alongside Nickelback and Default.

Track listing
 "Afterglow" (Tommy Lee) – 3:33
 "Hold Me Down" (Lee, Kai Huppunen) – 3:23
 "Body Architects" (Lee) – 2:57
 "Ashamed" (Lee, Huppunen) – 3:51 (featuring Chino Moreno of Deftones)
 "Fame 02" (David Bowie, John Lennon, Carlos Alomar) – 3:39
 "Blue" (Lee) – 4:30 (featuring Brandon Boyd of Incubus)
 "Sunday" (Lee, Huppunen) – 3:28
 "Why Is It" (Lee, Scott Humphrey) – 4:02
 "Face to Face" (Lee, Huppunen) – 2:57
 "Higher" (Lee, Marty O'Brien) – 4:00
 "People So Strange" (Lee) – 3:15
 "Mr. Shitty" (Skit) – 1:02

Charts

Album

Album (Year-end)

Singles

References

External links
 "Hold Me Down" music video on YouTube

2002 debut albums
MCA Records albums
Tommy Lee albums
Albums produced by Scott Humphrey
Nu metal albums by American artists